Nhanda, also rendered Nanda, Nhanta and Nhandi, is an Australian Aboriginal language from the Midwest region of Western Australia, between Geraldton and the Murchison River, from the coast to about  inland.  The language is now spoken, or semi-spoken, by only a few people.

The AIATSIS Austlang database says: "According to [Juliette] Blevins (2001:3) three dialects of Nhanda can be identified: Nhanda, the northernmost dialect, Watchandi W13, the central dialect, and Amangu W12, the southern dialect. Thus Nhanda is both a language name and a dialect name". No speakers are listed in successive tallies since 1975, but the Irra Wangga Language Centre (formerly Yamaji Language Centre) has been working on its revival, originally led by Blevins. Nanakarti was apparently a distinct language.

While Nhanda is usually considered a member of the Kartu branch of the Pama–Nyungan family, distinctive features of Nhanda, relative to neighbouring languages have caused some linguists to question this classification, and/or classify Nhanda as an isolate.

A controversial hypothesis, first raised by historian Rupert Gerritsen, suggests that the unusual features of Nhanda may result from undocumented language contact during the early modern era, with Dutch – in the form of shipwrecked seafarers stranded in Australia before European settlement had officially begun. Gerritsen's hypothesis has been rejected by linguist Juliette Blevins, an authority on Nhanda. Gerritsen critiqued the rejection of his views by Blevins in a subsequent paper, re-outlining his evidence of Dutch influence on Nhanda.

Vocabulary
The Nhanda word for 'man, human being' is arnmanu. It appears that when Norman Tindale collected information on Nhanda (or on the closely related variety thought to have been spoken in Geraldton) he was given this word, which he recorded as 'Amangu' and believed to be the 'tribal name' for this group.

Phonology
Nhanda differs somewhat from its neighbouring languages in that it has a phonemic glottal stop, is initial-dropping (i.e. it has lost many initial consonants, leading to vowel-initial words) and the stop consonants show a phonemic length contrast.

Vowels

Consonants

Language revival
Juliette Blevins, at the time employed at the University of Western Australia, researched Nhanda in the 1990s and early 2000s in collaboration with the Yamaji Language Centre (now the Irra Wangga Language Centre) and published a grammar of the language. An  illustrated topical dictionary, Nhanda Wangganhaa, was published by the Yamaji Language Centre in 1998. Other published works include papers on its phonology and history. Doug Marmion has also been working on the language.

References

Cited references

Other references

Kartu languages
Extinct languages of Western Australia